Enos or Enosh ( ʾĔnōš; "mortal man"; ;  Enṓs; Ge'ez: ሄኖስ/Henos)  is a figure in the Book of Genesis in the Hebrew Bible. He is described as the first son of Seth who figures in the Generations of Adam, and is also referred to within the genealogies of 1 Chronicles.

Enos is also mentioned in Islam in the various collections of tales of the pre-Islamic prophets, which honor him in an identical manner. Furthermore, early Islamic historians like Ibn Ishaq and Ibn Hisham always included his name in the genealogy of the Islamic prophet Muhammad, (Arabic: ’Anūsh أَنُوش  or: Yānish يَانِش).

In the Hebrew Bible
According to the Masoretic Genesis, Seth was 105 years old when Enos was born  (but the Septuagint version gives 205 years), and Seth had further sons and daughters. Enos was the grandson of Adam and Eve. According to Seder Olam Rabbah, based on Jewish reckoning, he was born in AM 235. According to the Septuagint, it was in AM 435.

Enos was the father of Kenan, who was born when Enos was 90 years old (or 190 years, according to the Septuagint). 

According to the Bible, Enos died at the age of 905, when Noah was aged 84 (as per Masoretic chronology).

In Judaism
 says: "And to Seth, to him also there was born a son; and he called his name Enosh; then began men to call upon the name of the Lord". The traditional Jewish interpretation of this verse, though, implies that it marked the beginning of idolatry, i.e. that men start dubbing "Lord" things that were mere creatures. This is because the previous generations, notably Adam, had already "begun calling upon the name of the Lord", which forces one to interpret הוחל huchal not as "began" but as the homonym "profanated". In this light, Enosh suggests the notion of a humanity (Enoshut) thinking of itself as an absolute rather than in relation to God (Enosh vs. Adam).

Maimonides in Mishneh Torah Avodat Kochavim chapter 1:1-2 writes:
"During the times of Enosh, mankind made a great mistake, and the wise men of that generation gave thoughtless counsel. Enosh himself was one of those who erred. Their mistake was as follows: They said God created stars and spheres with which to control the world. He placed them on high and treated them with honor, making them servants who minister before Him. Accordingly, it is fitting to praise and glorify them and to treat them with honor. [They perceived] this to be the will of God, blessed be He, that they magnify and honor those whom He magnified and honored, just as a king desires that the servants who stand before him be honored. Indeed, doing so is an expression of honor to the king."
Most of the commentators agree with this view.

In Christianity
Enos is included in the genealogy of Jesus, according to Luke 3:23–28.

Ethiopian Orthodox Bible
According to the Book of Jubilees (4:11-13) in the Ethiopian Orthodox Bible, Enos was born in AM 235, and "began to call on the name of the Lord on the earth." He married his sister, No'am, and she bore him Kenan in the year 325 AM. Ethiopian Orthodox tradition considers him a "faithful and righteous servant of God", and further credits him with the introduction, following a divine revelation, of the Ge'ez alphabet in its original, consonant-only form, "as an instrument for codifying the laws".

Latter-day Saint scripture
Enos, son of Seth is mentioned both in the Bible, and in distinctive Latter Day Saint texts. The Doctrine and Covenants teaches that Enos was ordained to the priesthood at age 134. When Adam called his posterity into the land of Adam-ondi-Ahman to give them a final blessing, Enos was one of the righteous high priests in attendance. The Joseph Smith Translation, as excerpted in the Book of Moses, states that Enos led the people of God to a promised land, which he named Cainan, after his son.

Enos, son of Seth is distinct from Enos, son of Jacob, the Nephite to whom the Book of Enos is ascribed, who is the son of Jacob, son of Lehi.

19th-century Protestantism
According to Matthew George Easton, 19th-century Scottish Presbyterian preacher and author of Easton's Bible Dictionary, "In his time 'men began to call upon the name of the Lord' (Gen. 4:26), meaning either (1) then began men to call themselves by the name of the Lord (marg.) i.e., to distinguish themselves thereby from idolaters; or (2) then men in some public and earnest way began to call upon the Lord, indicating a time of spiritual revival".

In Mandaeism

According to the Mandaean scriptures, including the Qolastā, the Book of John and Genzā Rabbā, Enosh is cognate with the angelic soteriological figure Anush Uthra, (sometimes translated as "Excellent Ennosh"), who is spoken of as the son or brother of Sheetil (Seth). Anush is a lightworld being (uthra) who taught John the Baptist and performed many of the same miracles within Jerusalem typically ascribed to Jesus by Christians.

Family tree
According to the Book of Jubilees:

See also
 Alulim

References

Creators of writing systems
Bereshit (parashah)
Book of Genesis people
Book of Jubilees
Hebrew Bible people in Mandaeism
Uthras